On 9 February 2020, Ingrid Escamilla Vargas was murdered by her partner, Erik Francisco Robledo Rosas, at her home in Mexico City after an argument. The act outraged the public opinion of Mexico for the brutality with which it was perpetrated and for the subsequent dissemination in the media and social media of images of the victim's body.

Background

Mexico has the second highest rate of femicides within Latin America, with an average of 10.5 femicides committed every day. The states with the highest incidence are Veracruz, State of Mexico, Nuevo León, Puebla, and Mexico City. Of these crimes, 3% are criminally investigated and 1% obtain convictions.

Ingrid Escamilla Vargas (born ) was a 25-year-old woman originally from Puebla. She received a master's degree in tourism business administration. Her partner was Erick Francisco Robledo Rosas, 46, who worked as a civil engineer. Both lived in a home in the Vallejo neighborhood of Gustavo A. Madero in the north of Mexico City and had been in a relationship for five years. Previously, the ex-wife of Robledo Rosas had filed a complaint against him alleging domestic violence.

Event

The crime against Ingrid Escamilla occurred after an argument in which Robledo Rosas went into a rage when questioned for drinking alcohol, which triggered a fight in which he received several slashes. Robledo Rosas stabbed Escamilla in the neck multiple times, killing her, then removed her skin and various organs which he then tried to flush down the toilet of his house. When he did not succeed, Robledo Rosas wrapped the remains in a green bag and left his home in order to discard it on the side of the street.

Robledo Rosas's son, who reportedly has autism, reportedly witnessed the murder. Robledo Rosas called the child's mother, his ex-wife, to confess that he had killed his partner. When the woman found out, she called the police, who found Robledo Rosas next to the body of Escamilla. Robledo Rosas was arrested by police and consigned to a public ministry. Videos on social media showed Robledo Rosas arrested in a patrol car with bloodied clothes and descriptively confessing the crime to the agents.

Escamilla's body was handed over to her relatives on 10 February and buried on 11 February in the pantheon of the municipality of Juan Galindo, where the victim was originally from. Before being buried, Escamilla was given a lying in state in the municipal presidency of Juan Galindo, from where she was a collaborator. The funeral was attended by about 300 people who demanded justice.

On 12 February 2020, a judge based in Mexico City found elements of guilt in the investigation provided by the Attorney General of Mexico City (FGJCDMX), for which Robledo Rosas was imprisoned preventively. After Robledo Rosas announced in his preliminary hearing that he would commit suicide, he was ordered to carry out a psychological assessment at the Men's Center for Psychosocial Rehabilitation of the South Preventive Prison for Men in Mexico City.

Distribution of images

On 10 February 2020, the headlines of the sensationalist newspapers ¡Pásala! and La Prensa appeared with the note of the murder, also showing photographs of the victim as it was found by first responders to the scene, such as police officers and members of expert services; likewise, these images were disseminated on social networks such as Twitter and Facebook, which generated outrage and a debate about the role of the media and the lack of a gender perspective around the work of the media by probably crediting a structural and entrenched phenomenon in the media industry. According to experts, this social phenomenon would distort the prosecution of crimes and their qualification as femicides.

The Mayor of Mexico City, Claudia Sheinbaum, announced that the dissemination of the images would be sanctioned. Therefore, an internal investigation on six public servants who may have leaked the photographs of Escamilla was opened. The prosecutor of Mexico City, Ernestina Godoy Ramos, supported Sheinbaum and described the leak as an offense not only to the victim and her family but "an offense to society." He also announced the proposal for a specific law that punishes the dissemination of images of crime victims by public officials. Prior to this crime there was a recommendation of the Commission of Human Rights of Mexico City to the capital authorities on the leak of images of victims occurred in a multiple homicide in Colonia Narvarte. The claim was supported by the Undersecretariat of Human Rights of Mexico City, belonging to the capital administration.

On 12 February, social media users such as in Twitter and Facebook began a campaign to put photographs not related to the crime, mentioning the name of the victim in order to remove the leaked images from searches and dignify the victim's memory.

On 14 February, the newspaper La Prensa published a letter on its front cover where it responded to the criticism. Its director, Luis Carriles, indicated that the newspaper followed all the protocols in force about the treatment of femicides.

Reactions

The Mayor of Mexico City Claudia Sheinbaum condemned the events and expressed her solidarity with the families of the victim.

The National Commission to Prevent and Eradicate Violence against Women in Mexico requested sanctions for those who disseminated images of the body of Ingrid and requested that those who carry out work on these facts duly comply with the Ley General de Acceso de las Mujeres a una Vida Libre de Violencia General ("Law on Women's Access to a Life Free of Violence").

On 14 February 14 demonstrations and protests were held in at least ten states of Mexico in repudiation of the crime of Ingrid Escamilla. In Mexico City, protesters went to the offices of the newspaper La Prensa to repudiate the publication of the victim's images. Some of them set fire to a vehicle owned by the newspaper.

On February 16, feminist groups organized a march that reached the outskirts of Ingrid Escamilla's home, where they held a protest and placed an offering in memory of the victim. There, her relatives asked the media for respect and dignified treatment. "Every time they are going to publish a photo, they are going to write a line, think, think it a bit, make it a clean communication, one that is not yellow," said Victoria Barrios, Ingrid's aunt.

Civil society organizations, activists and researchers published an open letter against gender-based violence directed at the media. "We express our total rejection of the exhibition in social media and networks of the body of the victims. In no case is it justifiable. The act of these newspapers and the viralization of photographs and videos is irresponsible, inhuman and revictimizes Ingrid and his family, in addition of perpetuating violence against women.", they said.

The Office of the United Nations High Commissioner for Human Rights condemned the crime and the subsequent dissemination of photographs.

The human rights organization Article 19 condemned the leak of the images "since they contravene the protocols of action in the investigation of femicides and international human rights standards. Therefore, these actions by FGJCDMX personnel are a violation of human rights of victims and women".

The Archdiocese of Mexico called on the Mexican authorities to provide justice in this case and requested that the crime not go unpunished.

See also
 Murder of Fátima Cecilia

References

2020 crimes in Mexico
Deaths by person in Mexico
Deaths by stabbing in Mexico
People murdered in Mexico